Lactarius distantifolius is a member of the large milk-cap genus Lactarius in the order Russulales. Found in Chiang Mai Province (northern Thailand), it was described as new to science in 2010. The fruit bodies of the fungus were found growing in a teak plantation (elevation ) with Dipterocarpus obtusifolius and other Dipterocarpus species, Pterocarpus macrocarpus, and Shorea species.

See also

List of Lactarius species

References

External links

distantifolius
Fungi described in 2010
Fungi of Asia